Aulatornoceras is a genus belonging to the subfamily Aulatornoceratinae, a member of the Goniatitida, an extinct order of shelled cephalopods included in the Ammonoidea.  Aulatornoceras, which has been considered a subgenus of Tornoceras has ventro-lateral grooves. As with Tornoceras, the suture forms six lobes. The shell itself is involute.

References

Goniatitida genera
Tornoceratidae
Late Devonian ammonites
Ammonites of Australia